Vyacheslav Arkadevich "Slava" Bykov (born 24 July 1960 in Chelyabinsk, Russian SFSR, Soviet Union) is a former Soviet and Russian ice hockey player and a former head coach of the Russian national hockey team. A small, technically gifted center, he was a regular fixture on the Soviet national ice hockey team in the 1980s; after the fall of the Soviet Union, he played for Team Russia in the 1990s. He was drafted by the Quebec Nordiques in the 1989 NHL Entry Draft in the 9th round at number 169 overall. He opted, however, to never play in the NHL.

Playing career 
Bykov started out playing for the team in his home city, Traktor Chelyabinsk in 1979. After 3 years, he went to play for CSKA Moscow. While at CSKA Moscow, he became a regular on the Soviet national team and later Team Russia, taking part in the following international tournaments:

 With the Soviet Union:
 1983 World Championships (Gold)
 1985 World Championships (Bronze)
 1986 World Championships (Gold)
 1987 World Championships (Silver)
 1987 Canada Cup (Silver)
 1988 Olympics (Gold)
 1989 World Championships (Gold)
With the Unified team:
 1992 Olympics (Gold)
With Russia:
 1993 World Championships (Gold)
 1995 World Championships (5th place)

In 1990 he went to play with HC Fribourg-Gottéron in the Swiss Nationalliga A. He ended an illustrious playing career in 2000 having played the last two seasons with HC Lausanne in the Nationalliga B.

Coaching career

Russian national team
On 10 August 2006, Bykov was named as the new head coach of the Russian national hockey team taking over from Vladimir Krikunov. In 2007 World Championship in Moscow he won bronze with Russian national team. Then, on 18 May 2008, he won World Championships Gold in Quebec with the team, and on 10 May 2009 again in Bern. After losing 3–7 to Canada and finishing 6th in 2010 Winter Olympics and failing to win gold in two subsequent WCs he was fired by the RHF.

 2007 World Championships (Bronze)
 2008 World Championships (Gold)
 2009 World Championships (Gold)
 2010 Winter Olympics (6th)
 2010 World Championships (Silver)
 2011 World Championships (4th)

CSKA
From 28 April 2004 to 4 April 2009 Bykov worked as the head coach of CSKA Moscow. The best results during this period were the semi-finals of the Russian Superleague and the quarter-finals of the KHL.

Salavat Yulaev
Salavat Yulaev Ufa named Bykov as new head coach on 14 May 2009 starting from season 2009/2010. After winning Continental Cup and taking bronze in 2009/2010, he won the Gagarin Cup with Salavat Yulaev in 2010/2011.

SKA Saint Petersburg
SKA Saint Petersburg appointed Bykov as new head coach on 4 April 2014. Bykov signed a two-year contract with an option for a one-year extension. In his first season with the team, Bykov coached SKA to their first ever Gagarin Cup win, becoming the only coach to win the Gagarin Cup with two different teams.

Career statistics

Regular season and playoffs

International

Personal life
He is married and has two children. In 2003, he became a naturalised Swiss citizen and his family lives in Marly, Switzerland.

He is of Mari descent.

References

External links 

 

1960 births
Living people
HC CSKA Moscow players
HC Fribourg-Gottéron players
Ice hockey players at the 1988 Winter Olympics
Ice hockey players at the 1992 Winter Olympics
IIHF Hall of Fame inductees
Lausanne HC players
Olympic gold medalists for the Soviet Union
Olympic gold medalists for the Unified Team
Olympic ice hockey players of the Soviet Union
Olympic ice hockey players of the Unified Team
Sportspeople from Chelyabinsk
Quebec Nordiques draft picks
Russia men's national ice hockey team coaches
Russian ice hockey centres
Russian ice hockey coaches
Soviet expatriate ice hockey players
Soviet expatriate sportspeople in Switzerland
Soviet ice hockey centres
Traktor Chelyabinsk players
Olympic medalists in ice hockey
Medalists at the 1988 Winter Olympics
Medalists at the 1992 Winter Olympics
Honoured Coaches of Russia
Honoured Masters of Sport of the USSR
Russian expatriate sportspeople in Switzerland
Russian expatriate ice hockey people
Expatriate ice hockey players in Switzerland